South Kearny, also known as Kearny Point, is an industrial district and distinct area of the western part of Hudson County, New Jersey at the northern end of Newark Bay in the town of Kearny, New Jersey. It is on the larger peninsula once called New Barbadoes Neck, which also include the other Kearny districts of the Uplands (a part of which is called Arlington) and the Kearny Meadows. It has been known as Kearny Point and, along Droyer's Point in Jersey City, marks the mouth of the Hackensack River to the east. The Passaic River flows along its western border opposite a similarly industrial portion of the Ironbound district of Newark. Most of the point is part of Foreign-Trade Zone 49

The Newark and New York Railroad Bridge, part of Central Railroad of New Jersey, The Newark Plank Road, and the Morris Canal all crossed the point running parallel to each other. Currently, both the Lincoln Highway and The Pulaski Skyway traverse South Kearny, a ramp of the latter built specifically to spur industrial development Among the many facilities that are located there are the Hudson County Correctional Facility and River Terminal, a massive distribution warehouse that includes the former site of a Western Electric's Kearny Works manufacturing plant and the Kearny Yard of Federal Shipbuilding and Drydock Company.

Road Movie was the filmed there in 1974. Two film television studios opened on Kearny Point in 2000s, Palisades Stages and 10 Basin Studios.

Transportation

Hudson County Route 659 runs along Central Avenue, Pennsylvania Avenue, and Fish House Road. New Jersey Transit bus route #1 serve the area. Numerous crossings of the Hackensack and Passaic pass through the area.

References

External links
Web photo exhibit of ship christening and launching ceremonies at the Kearny Yard

Kearny, New Jersey
Geography of Hudson County, New Jersey
Neighborhoods in Hudson County, New Jersey
New Jersey populated places on the Hackensack River